Sharonda McDonald-Kelley is an American former softball player and current head coach at Michigan State.

Playing career
McDonald played college softball for Texas A&M from 2004 to 2007. She was named the Big 12 Conference Softball Freshman of the Year in 2004. As a sophomore in 2005, she was a perfect 48-for-48 in stolen bases and won the inaugural NFCA Golden Shoe Award.

Coaching career

Campbell
On June 19, 2018, McDonald-Kelley was named the head coach of Campbell.

Michigan State
On June 10, 2022, Sharonda McDonald-Kelley was announced as the new head coach of the Michigan State softball program, replacing Jacquie Joseph who retired as head coach after 29 seasons.

Head coaching record

College

References

Living people
Texas A&M Aggies softball players
Florida Gators softball coaches
LSU Tigers softball coaches
Michigan State Spartans softball coaches
Ohio Bobcats softball coaches
Ohio State Buckeyes softball coaches
Texas Tech Red Raiders softball coaches
American softball coaches
Year of birth missing (living people)